Tara Vaitiére Hoyos-Martinez (born 28 March 1990) is an English actress and beauty pageant titleholder who, while representing London, was crowned Miss Universe Great Britain 2010. She is of Colombian descent.  She then represented Great Britain in the Miss Universe 2010 pageant, held on 23 August 2010 in Las Vegas, United States. She did not place in the competition's Top 15.

Hoyos-Martinez was born to Colombian parents. She graduated from the Manchester Metropolitan University with a degree in Biomedical Science.

References

1990 births
Actresses from London
Alumni of Manchester Metropolitan University
British actors of Latin American descent
English beauty pageant winners
English people of Colombian descent
Living people
Miss Universe 2010 contestants
Models from London